Odds Ballklubb, commonly known as Odd, is a Norwegian professional football club from Skien. Originally the football section of a multi-sports club, founded in 1894 nine years after the club's founding. Most sports other than football and gymnastics were discontinued and the club became dedicated primarily to football. Odd plays in the Norwegian top division, Eliteserien, and holds the record of winning the Norwegian Football Cup the most times with twelve wins, the last coming in 2000. The club was known as Odd Grenland between 1994 and 2012. Founded in 1894, Odd is the oldest football club in Norway. As of 13 May 2017 the club was granted a membership in Club of Pioneers. It then became the first Nordic football club to be granted this membership.

History 
IF Odd was founded in 1885, and is thus one of the older sports clubs in Norway still in existence. The name derives from Viktor Rydberg's novel Seierssverdet, where one of the main characters was a Norwegian athlete called Orvar Odd.

In the beginning, IF Odd was mainly focused on gymnastics, and also had a department for Nordic skiing and track and field. A department for football, named Odds BK, was founded on 31 March 1894. This was the club's second effort to do so, some time after English workers at nearby Skotfoss brought the game of football to Skien, and the city decided to buy a football. Odd is counted as Norway's oldest football team still in existence.

Odd started a cooperation with the local club Pors in 1994, and changed their names to Odd Grenland and Pors Grenland, in an effort to represent the district of Grenland. In conjunction with the name change, a public limited company named Grenland Fotball was founded. Pors Grenland withdrew from the cooperation in December 2009, and in January 2013 Odd Grenland decided to change its name back to Odds BK because they wanted to be a club for the entire county of Telemark.

Odd won the Norwegian Football Cup in 1903, 1904, 1905, 1906, 1913, 1915, 1919, 1922, 1924, 1926, 1931 and 2000, more than any other team in Norway. In the late 20th century, the men's team struggled in the lower divisions for many years, but made it back to the Tippeligaen in 1999 and stayed there until they were relegated in 2007. The team had survived relegation twice; first in 2005 after a dreadful start of the campaign, then in 2006 when the team only survived relegation by beating Bryne in the relegation play-offs. In 2007 the team was relegated to the 1. divisjon after being beaten by Bodø/Glimt in the relegation play-offs. In 2008, with three games still to play, Odd secured the promotion back to the Tippeligaen after winning 4–0 at home against Hødd.

On 25 September 2011, Odd player Jone Samuelsen scored what is claimed to be the longest headed goal ever scored in a match, in a match against Tromsø, when he headed the ball from within his own half of the pitch into Tromsø's open goal, the goalkeeper having come forward for a late corner in the match. Norwegian police were invited to measure the distance, and calculated the length as to be 58.13 metres.

Home ground

The home ground is Skagerak Arena (capacity 12,000). Largest crowd: Approx 12,500 people in 1984 Cup semi-final against Viking, though the official number is 8854. Officially, the highest attendance is 12.436, achieved in the 2015 Europa League play-off against Borussia Dortmund. The stadium was rebuilt to hold a capacity of between 13,000 and 14,000, and was finished in 2008. It is named Skagerak Arena after local sponsor Skagerak Energi.

Players and staff

First-team squad

 

For season transfers, see transfers winter 2021–22 and transfers summer 2022.

Out on loan

Coaching staff

Achievements 
Eliteserien:
Runners-up (2): 1950–51, 1956–57
1. divisjon:
 Winners (2): 1998, 2008
Norwegian Football Cup:
 Winners (12) (Joint-Record): 1903, 1904, 1905, 1906, 1913, 1915, 1919, 1922, 1924, 1926, 1931, 2000
Runners-up (9): 1902, 1908, 1909, 1910, 1921, 1937, 1960, 2002, 2014

Recent history
{|class="wikitable"
|-bgcolor="#efefef"
! Season
! 
! Pos.
! Pl.
! W
! D
! L
! GS
! GA
! P
!Cup
!Notes
|-
|2000
|Tippeligaen
|align=right |8
|align=right|26||align=right|11||align=right|5||align=right|10
|align=right|40||align=right|31||align=right|38
|bgcolor=gold|Winner
|
|-
|2001
|Tippeligaen
|align=right |6
|align=right|26||align=right|12||align=right|6||align=right|8
|align=right|50||align=right|40||align=right|42
|Semi-final
|
|-
|2002
|Tippeligaen
|align=right |6
|align=right|26||align=right|12||align=right|5||align=right|9
|align=right|36||align=right|30||align=right|41
|bgcolor=silver|Final
|
|-
|2003
|Tippeligaen
|align=right |4
|align=right|26||align=right|11||align=right|5||align=right|10
|align=right|46||align=right|43||align=right|38
||Third round
|
|-
|2004
|Tippeligaen
|align=right |8
|align=right|26||align=right|9||align=right|8||align=right|9
|align=right|47||align=right|44||align=right|35
||Third round
|
|-
|2005
|Tippeligaen
|align=right |9
|align=right|26||align=right|9||align=right|6||align=right|11
|align=right|28||align=right|51||align=right|33
||Quarter-final
|
|-
|2006
|Tippeligaen
|align=right |12
|align=right|26||align=right|7||align=right|8||align=right|11
|align=right|30||align=right|38||align=right|29
||Third round
|
|-
|2007
|Tippeligaen
|align=right bgcolor="#FFCCCC"| 12
|align=right|26||align=right|8||align=right|3||align=right|15
|align=right|33||align=right|43||align=right|27
|Semi-final
|Relegated to the 1. divisjon
|-
|2008
|1. divisjon
|align=right bgcolor=#DDFFDD| 1
|align=right|30||align=right|20||align=right|5||align=right|5
|align=right|76||align=right|44||align=right|65
|Semi-final
|Promoted to the Tippeligaen
|-
|2009
|Tippeligaen
|align=right |4
|align=right|30||align=right|12||align=right|10||align=right|8
|align=right|53||align=right|44||align=right|46
|Semi-final
|
|-
|2010
|Tippeligaen
|align=right |5
|align=right|30||align=right|12||align=right|10||align=right|8
|align=right|48||align=right|41||align=right|46
|Semi-final
|
|-
|2011 
|Tippeligaen
|align=right |5
|align=right|30||align=right|14||align=right|6||align=right|10
|align=right|44||align=right|44||align=right|48
||Fourth round
|
|-
|2012 
|Tippeligaen
|align=right |10
|align=right|30||align=right|11||align=right|7||align=right|12
|align=right|40||align=right|43||align=right|39
||Fourth round
|
|-
|2013
|Tippeligaen
|align=right |7
|align=right|30||align=right|11||align=right|7||align=right|12
|align=right|43||align=right|39||align=right|40
||Fourth round
|
|-
|2014 
|Tippeligaen
|bgcolor=#c96 align=right|3
|align=right|30||align=right|17||align=right|7||align=right|6
|align=right|52||align=right|32||align=right|58
|bgcolor=silver|Final
|
|-
|2015
|Tippeligaen
|align=right |4
|align=right|30||align=right|15||align=right|10||align=right|5
|align=right|61||align=right|41||align=right|55
||Quarter-final
|
|-
|2016 
|Tippeligaen
|bgcolor=#c96 align=right|3
|align=right|30||align=right|15||align=right|6||align=right|9
|align=right|44||align=right|35||align=right|51
||Fourth round
|
|-
|2017 
|Eliteserien
|align=right|6
|align=right|30||align=right|12||align=right|6||align=right|12
|align=right|27||align=right|39||align=right|42
||Fourth round
|
|-
|2018
|Eliteserien
|align=right|9
|align=right|30||align=right|11||align=right|7||align=right|12
|align=right|39||align=right|38||align=right|40
||Fourth round
|
|-
|2019 
|Eliteserien
|align=right|4
|align=right|30||align=right|15||align=right|7||align=right|8
|align=right|45||align=right|40||align=right|52
||Semi-final
|
|-
|2020 
|Eliteserien
|align=right|7
|align=right|30||align=right|13||align=right|4||align=right|13
|align=right|52||align=right|51||align=right|43
||Cancelled
|
|-
|2021 
|Eliteserien
|align=right|13
|align=right|30||align=right|8||align=right|9||align=right|13
|align=right|44||align=right|58||align=right|33
||Fourth round
|
|-
|2022 
|Eliteserien
|align=right|5
|align=right|30||align=right|13||align=right|6||align=right|11
|align=right|43||align=right|45||align=right|45
||
|
|}

European record

Overview

Matches

Notes
 1Q: First qualifying round
 2Q: Second qualifying round
 1R: First round
 PO. Play-off round

Managers 
 Lennart Söderberg (1983–84)
 Tore Andersen (1990)
 Paul Wilson (1991–93)
 Lars Borgar Waage (1994–97)
 Tom Nordlie (1998–99)
 Arne Sandstø (1 January 1999– 28 September 2007)
 Gaute Larsen (2005–07)
 Ove Flindt-Bjerg (28 September 2007 – 17 December 2007)
 Dag-Eilev Fagermo (17 December 2007 – 31 January 2020)
 Jan Frode Nornes (11 March 2020 – 8 January 2022)
 Pål Arne Johansen (24 January 2022 – )

References

External links 

 
 Oddrane supporter club website

 
Football clubs in Norway
Eliteserien clubs
Association football clubs established in 1894
1894 establishments in Norway
Sport in Skien
Defunct athletics clubs in Norway